Ewesley station was a weather board and corrugated iron built railway station in Northumberland on the Rothbury Branch built to serve the local farming settlements.

History

They also were permitted to build a short branch line to Cornhill. The North British Railway and the branch line became part of the London and North Eastern Railway in 1923. In September 1952 passenger services were withdrawn and the line closed in November 1963.

One of the original stations on the branch line Ewesley was constructed in the centre of a circular prehistoric camp. Later in 1894 the only passing loop on the otherwise single track line was constructed at Ewesley. At closure the station had been renamed Ewesley Halt. Although in a bad state of repair the platform remains intact, the station building has been demolished.

References

External links
Ewesley station on Northumbrian Railways
Ewesley station on Disused Stations
Ewesley on a navigable 1956 O. S. map
The line on RailScot

Disused railway stations in Northumberland
Former North British Railway stations
Railway stations in Great Britain opened in 1870
Railway stations in Great Britain closed in 1963